Xavier Léon-Dufour (Paris, 7 March 1912–13 November 2007) was a French Jesuit biblical scholar and theologian. He was professor of the Bible at the centre Sèvres and director of collections at éditions du Seuil and éditions du Cerf.

In the years 1948-1957 he was a lecturer of the Holy Bible in the Jesuit theological faculty of Enghien in Belgium. From there, he moved to Lyon-Fourvière. He was a consultor of the Pontifical Biblical Commission in Rome and a member of the New Testament study society - Studiorum Novi Testamenti Societas. He published in theological magazines: "Recherches de Science Religieuse" and "New Testament Studies".

He is best known for his Vocabulary of Biblical Theology, published in 1962, a work that remains, fifty years later, a reference book for students in theology. He has done important work on the synoptic gospels and on the gospel according to John. He took part in the doctrinal controversies that followed the Second Vatican Council.

Xavier Léon-Dufour made the choice to become a priest at the age of 17. While a priest, he was a resistance in the Southwest network during World War II.

He was president of the Studiorum Novi Testamenti Societas in 1980.

Works 
 
 
 
  and its English version:

See also

References

1912 births
2007 deaths
French biblical scholars
20th-century French Jesuits
20th-century French Catholic theologians